Garrison Stadium is a 5,000-seat college football stadium located in Murfreesboro, North Carolina. The stadium has been the home of the Hawks football team of Chowan University since the sixties. Beginning with the 2008 athletic year, the Hawks will compete in the National Collegiate Athletic Association (NCAA) Division II Central Intercollegiate Athletic Association (CIAA) as a football-only member.

Improvements to the stadium took place in July 2007 which included new lights, perimeter fencing and upgrades to the grass field.

References

External links
Athletics website

College football venues
Chowan Hawks football
Sports venues in North Carolina
Buildings and structures in Murfreesboro, North Carolina
American football venues in North Carolina
1960s establishments in North Carolina
Sports venues completed in the 1960s